Marwan Abboud (born 25 August 1969) is a Lebanese politician and judge, who was appointed governor of Beirut in June 2020.

He was in office as governor during the 2020 Beirut explosion, and broke down in tears on television, calling it "a national catastrophe".

He was previously President of the Supreme Disciplinary Authority, appointed to the role on 14 November 2012. He had responsibility for reviewing allegations of corruption among civil servants.

References 

1969 births
People from Batroun District
Living people
Lebanese politicians
Lebanese judges